Rupkatha Noy is a 2013 Bengali film directed by Atanu Ghosh and produced by Firdausal Hassan and Probal Halder for Friends Communication. The music was composed by Joy Sarkar.

Plot 
Sisir Roy (Soumitra Chatterjee) is a 72-year-old man, long retired from a government office as Upper Division Clerk. His family consists of his son Prasanta (Bhaskar Banerjee) and daughter-in-law Mandira (Soma Chakrabarty). Sisir's wife died many years ago. Every day, Sisir goes to the park and interacts with different people. Over a period of time, five young people become acquainted with him. Ahana (Sohini Sarkar), a newly married girl, restless and immature, who repeatedly flees from her in-law's place, much to the anxiety of people close to her. Her newly married husband Prasit (Gourab Chakrabarty) is quite baffled about her behaviour and is desperately on the lookout for a solution. Saswata (Kaushik Sen) is a 35-year-old man who teaches Mathematics in a boys' school. For the last eleven years, he has been entrusted to teach Calculus. Saswata has no thrill in life and is desperately in search of that. Sananda (Radhika Apte), a 30-year-old IT engineer, is a single mother of a 3-year-old child. Sananda has a dreadful past, which keeps haunting her. Biswanath (Rahul) is a typist who sits on one side of the park, quite aware that the number of customers is rapidly dwindling as more and more people prefer electronic type using computers, but he does not have the means to buy a computer. Reena (Nina Chakrabarty) is a young girl, working at a petrol pump, who is struggling against an uncertain future and insecurity. All these five people are either going through or on the verge of a crisis in their lives. In midst of such a situation, Sisir's son and daughter-in-law leave for Meerut. And now Sisir is left completely alone. Detached from his own kin, Sisir now reaches out to his extended family by involving himself more intimately with the four new people in his life. He touches upon their minds trying to change their thoughts, and in turn, their lives. But in the process, he puts his own life into a vortex of complexities.

Cast 
 
 Soumitra Chatterjee as Sisir
 Radhika Apte as Sananda
 Kaushik Sen as Saswata
 Indraneil Sengupta as Sananda's husband
 Rahul as Biswanath
 Sohini Sarkar as Ahana
 Gaurav Chakrabarty as Prasit
 Nina Chakrabarty as Reena
 Bhaskar Banerjee as Prasanta
 Soma Chakrabarty as Mandira
 Arindam Sil as Prasanta's friend

Awards and festivals 
 Nominated for FIPRESCI Award for Best Indian Film 2013  
 Filmfare Awards  
Best Director (Critic's Choice) - Atanu Ghosh 
Best Actor (Critic's Choice) - Soumitra Chatterjee
Best Playback (Female) – Anwesha Dutta Gupta (Saradin aar Sararaat)
Best Debut Actor – Sohini Sarkar
 Best Director Award - Noida International Film Festival 2014 
Hyderabad Bengali Film Festival
 Official Selection
Competitive Section - Dhaka International Film Festival 2014
Competitive Section - Bangalore International Film Festival 2013
Indian Panorama - Chennai International Film Festival 2013
Competitive Section - Noida International Film Festival 2014
Spectrum Asia - Third Eye Asian Film Festival 2014
Indian Showcase - Delhi International Film Festival 2013
World Panorama - Shanghai International Film Festival 2014

See also 
 Angshumaner Chhobi
 Takhan Teish

References

External links 
 

Bengali-language Indian films
2010s Bengali-language films
Films set in Kolkata
Indian drama films
Films directed by Atanu Ghosh
2013 drama films
2013 films